Mimumesa is a genus of wasps in the family Crabronidae. The species are found in the Holarctic. 32 species are known to exist.

Species (Asia)
Mimumesa melanosomatica (Ma and Q. Li 2009)
Mimumesa mishimae (Tsuneki 1984)
Mimumesa nonstriata (Ma and Q. Li 2009)
Mimumesa scutiprotruberantis (L. Ma, X. Chen and Q. Li 2010)
Mimumesa vanlithi (Tsuneki 1954)

Species (Europe)
Mimumesa atratina (F. Morawitz 1891)
Mimumesa beaumonti (van Lith 1949)
Mimumesa dahlbomi (Wesmael 1852)
Mimumesa littoralis (Bondroit 1934)
Mimumesa sibiricina (R. Bohart 1976)
Mimumesa spooneri (Richards 1948)
Mimumesa unicolor (Vander Linden 1829)
Mimumesa wuestneii (Faester 1951)

Species (North America)
Mimumesa bermudensis (Malloch 1933)
Mimumesa canadensis (Malloch 1933)
Mimumesa clypeata (W. Fox 1898)
Mimumesa coloradensis (Cameron 1908)
Mimumesa cylindrica (W. Fox 1898)
Mimumesa fuscipes (Packard 1867)
Mimumesa interstitialis (Cameron 1908)
Mimumesa johnsoni (Vierick 1901)
Mimumesa leucopus (Say 1837)
Mimumesa longicornis (W. Fox 1898)
Mimumesa mandibularis (H. Smith 1908)
Mimumesa mellipes (Say 1837)
Mimumesa mixta (W. Fox 1898)
Mimumesa modesta (Rohwer 1915)
Mimumesa nigra (Packard 1867)
Mimumesa petiolata (F. Smith 1863)
Mimumesa propinqua (Kincaid 1900)
Mimumesa psychra (Pate 1856)
Mimumesa regularis (W. Fox 1898)

References

External links
Mimumesa images at  Consortium for the Barcode of Life
 Catalog of Sphecidae California Academy of Sciences Institute of Biodiversity

Crabronidae
Hymenoptera of Europe
Apoidea genera